Henrique Afonso da Silva Horta (21 September 1920 – 29 January 2012) was a Portuguese colonial administrator, and a vice-admiral of the Portuguese Navy.

He entered the Naval School in 1940, and served as naval officer in the 1950s in Portuguese Guinea, where he was also president of Bissau's municipal council. He was the last commander of the navy school ship Sagres II and the first commander of the Sagres III in 1961. After the Carnation Revolution of April 1974, which toppled the fascist regime of Estado Novo, he was Governor of Cape Verde from 6 August until 21 September 1974. He was Minister of the Republic for the Azores Autonomous Region from 11 September 1978 until 28 April 1981. He retired from service in 1990, and died on 29 January 2012.

He received the following decorations:
Portuguese:
 Commander of the Order of Prince Henry
 Grand Cross of the Order of Christ
 Grand Cross of the Military Order of Avis
foreign:
 Austria: Grand Cross of the Order of Merit 
 Belgium: Grand Cross of the Order of Leopold II
 Brazil: Officer of the Order of Naval Merit, Silver Medal of Merit Santos-Dumont, Knight of Order of Aeronautical Merit, Medal of Merit Tamandaré
 Congo: Grand Officer of the Order of Merit
 Denmark: Grand Cross of the Order of the Dannebrog
 Egypt: 1st Class of the Order of Merit
 France: Commander of the National Order of the Legion of Honour
 Greece: Grand Cross of the Order of the Phoenix
 Hungary: Grand Cross of the Order of the Flag
 Iceland: Grand Cross of the Order of the Falcon
 Italy: Grand Cross of the Order of Merit
 Luxembourg: Grand Cross of the Order of Adolphe of Nassau
 Malta: Grand Cross of the Order pro Merito Melitensi
 Norway: Grand Cross of the Order of St. Olav
 Spain: Cross of First Class with White Badge of the Order of Naval Merit 
 United Kingdom: Grand Officer of the Royal Victorian Order
 Yugoslavia: Grand Cross of the Order of the Yugoslav Flag

See also
List of colonial governors of Cape Verde

References

1920 births
2012 deaths
People from Lisbon
Colonial heads of Cape Verde
Portuguese colonial governors and administrators
Portuguese admirals
Portuguese expatriates in Guinea-Bissau